

279001–279100 

|-id=035
| 279035 Mara ||  || Mara Ruiz (born 2000), the daughter of Spanish co-discoverer Jose Maria Ruiz (currently not credited by the Minor Planet Center). || 
|}

279101–279200 

|-id=119
| 279119 Khamatova ||  || Chulpan Khamatova (born 1975), a Russian theater and film actress || 
|}

279201–279300 

|-id=226
| 279226 Demisroussos ||  || Demis Roussos (1946–2015), a Greek singer and performer, best remembered for being a member of Aphrodite's Child, a rock band that also included Greek musician Vangelis || 
|-id=274
| 279274 Shurpakov ||  || Sergey Shurpakov (born 1966), a Belarusian amateur astronomer, observer of comets and discoverer of minor planets and coordinator of the "International Comet Quarterly" (ICQ) for Belarus || 
|}

279301–279400 

|-id=377
| 279377 Lechmankiewicz ||  || Lech Mankiewicz (born 1960), a director of the Center for Theoretical Physics of the Polish Academy of Sciences in Warsaw. || 
|-id=397
| 279397 Dombeck ||  || Thomas W. Dombeck (1945–2016) received his Physics PhD from Northwestern University. He displayed his creative genius as professor, research scientist, project director for Pan-STARRS, husband and father. || 
|}

279401–279500 

|-id=410
| 279410 McCallon ||  || Howard McCallon (born 1945), an American engineer. || 
|}

279501–279600 

|-bgcolor=#f2f2f2
| colspan=4 align=center | 
|}

279601–279700 

|-bgcolor=#f2f2f2
| colspan=4 align=center | 
|}

279701–279800 

|-id=723
| 279723 Wittenberg ||  || Wittenberg, a town situated in Saxony-Anhalt, Germany. It was starting point of the Reformation, where Martin Luther posted his The Ninety-Five Theses in 1517. || 
|}

279801–279900 

|-bgcolor=#f2f2f2
| colspan=4 align=center | 
|}

279901–280000 

|-bgcolor=#f2f2f2
| colspan=4 align=center | 
|}

References 

279001-280000